The Narragansett Pacer was the first horse breed developed in the United States, but is now extinct. It was developed in the United States during the 18th century and associated closely with the state of Rhode Island, and it had become extinct by the late 19th century. The Pacer was developed from a mix of English and Spanish breeds, although the exact cross is unknown, and they were known to and owned by many famous personages of the day, including George Washington. Sales to the Caribbean and cross-breeding diminished the breed to the point of extinction, and the last known Pacer died around 1880.

The Narragansett was possibly an ambling horse, rather than a true pacing breed. It was known as a sure-footed, dependable breed, although not flashy or always good-looking. Pacers were used for racing and general riding. They were frequently crossed with other breeds, and provided the foundation for several other American breeds, including the American Saddlebred, Standardbred and Tennessee Walking Horse.

History

Highly valued by plantation owners of the 19th century, the Narragansett Pacer had a major influence on many American gaited breeds. The breed was especially associated with the state of Rhode Island in the early 18th century, but had become extinct by the late 19th century. It was known as the first breed of horse developed in America. The exact origins of the breed are unknown, but it was probably developed from a cross between English "ambling" horses and Spanish breeds. These Spanish breeds often included bloodlines that included lateral gaits. The horses developed from this cross were known for their smoothness and sure-footedness over poor terrain. The English horses which contributed to the Narragansett Pacer may have been members of the Irish Hobby breed; another possible ancestor is the Galloway pony. In the early 18th century, William Robinson, the Lieutenant Governor of Rhode Island, began the serious development of the breed with a stallion named "Old Snip"—speculated to be either an Irish Hobby or an Andalusian, and considered the father of the breed.

In 1768, George Washington owned and raced a Narragansett Pacer, while in 1772, Edmund Burke asked an American friend for a pair. Paul Revere possibly rode a Pacer during his 1775 ride to warn the Americans of a British march. The extinction was due mainly to the breed being sold in such large numbers to sugarcane planters in the West Indies that breeding stock was severely diminished in the United States. The few horses that were left were crossbred to create and improve other breeds and the pure strain of the Narragansett soon became extinct. North Carolina was also a noted to have breeders of the Narragansett, with breeding stock having been brought to the area as early as 1790 by early pioneers. The last known Pacer, a mare, died around 1880.

Characteristics

The Narragansett Pacer was not exclusively a pacing horse, as strong evidence indicates it exhibited an ambling gait, which is a four-beat, intermediate-speed gait, while the pace is a two-beat, intermediate-speed gait. The amble is more comfortable to ride than the pace, and Narragansett Pacers were known for their qualities as both riding and driving horses. James Fenimore Cooper described them as: "They have handsome foreheads, the head clean, the neck long, the arms and legs thin and tapered."; however, another source stated, "The hindquarters are narrow and the hocks a little crooked...", but also said, "They are very spirited and carry both the head and tail high. But what is more remarkable is that they amble with more speed than most horses trot, so that it is difficult to put some of them upon a gallop." Other viewers of the breed rarely called them stylish or good-looking, although they considered them dependable, easy to work with and sure-footed.

Uses

The breed was used for "pacing races" in Rhode Island, where the Baptist population allowed races when the greater part of Puritan New England did not. Pacers reportedly covered the one-mile tracks in a little more than two minutes.

The Narragansett Pacer played a significant role in the creation of the American Saddlebred, the Standardbred and the Tennessee Walking Horse. The breed was also combined with French pacers to create the Canadian Pacer, a breed especially suited to racing over ice and which also contributed substantially to the creation of the Standardbred. In the early 19th century, Pacer mares were bred to stallions of the fledgling Morgan breed. However, the Morgan breed was selected for a trot as an intermediate gait, and thus ambling horses were frowned upon, so most Narragansett/Morgan crosses were sold to Canada, the Caribbean, and South America, so the bloodlines did not remain within the Morgan breed. Other breeds indirectly influenced by the Narragansett Pacer include the Rocky Mountain Horse, a gaited breed started in Kentucky, and the Tiger Horse, a gaited breed with Appaloosa patterning.

Footnotes

References

External links
Facsimile edition of Dodge, T. A. (1892). "The Horse in America". North American Review, vol. CLV, pp. 667-683.
Facsimile edition of Earle, A. M. (1890). "Narragansett Pacers". New England Magazine, vol. II March-August, pp. 39-42.
Facsimile edition of Updike, W. (1847). "History of the Church in Narragansett". United States Magazine, and Democratic Review, vol. XXI,	pp. 347-353.

Extinct horse breeds
Horse breeds originating in the United States
Horse breeds